The 1984–85 DFB-Pokal was the 42nd season of the annual German football cup competition. It began on 31 August 1984 and ended on 26 May 1985. 64 teams competed in the tournament of six rounds. In the final Bayer 05 Uerdingen defeated title holders Bayern Munich 2–1.

Matches

First round

Replays

Second round

Replay

Round of 16

Replay

Quarter-finals

Semi-finals

Final

References

External links
 Official site of the DFB 
 Kicker.de 

1984-85
1984–85 in German football cups